Athagarh (Sl. No.: 89) is a Vidhan Sabha constituency of Cuttack district, Odisha.

This constituency includes Athagad NAC, Athagarh Block, Tigiria Block and 6 Gram panchayats (Kakhadi, Sankarpur, Badasamantarapur, Mangarajpur, Mahisalanda and Brahmapur) of Tangi-Chowdwar Block.

Nearby villages & towns of Tigiria Nizigarh are Baliput, Baneswarpada, Bindhanima, Biriput, Godarabandha, Bhiruda, Godijharia, achalkot, Haridapasi, Sanapatna,
Tigiria  is the smallest princely state in Odisha and famous for many historical reasons. Even though as per revenue department it is a village but all facilities available within just one square kilometre. There are 2 Government High schools, two colleges, one head post office, Court, Police station, hospital everything available here. Places of Tourist attraction like Ansupa Lake (12 km), Bhatarika Temple (21 km), Dhabaleswar Temple (25 km) are nearby Tigiria.

Elected Members

Eighteen elections were held between 1951 and 2012 including three By elections in 1967, 1980 and 2012.
Elected members from the Athagarh constituency are:

2019: (89): Ranendra Pratap Swain (BJD)
2014: (89): Ranendra Pratap Swain (BJD)
2012: (Bye Poll): Ranendra Pratap Swain (BJD)
2009: (89): Ramesh Rout (Independent)
2004: (47): Ranendra Pratap Swain (BJD)
2000: (47): Ranendra Pratap Swain (BJD)
1995: (47): Ranendra Pratap Swain (Janata Dal)
1990: (47): Ranendra Pratap Swain (Janata Dal)
1985: (47): Janaki Ballabh Patnaik (Congress)
1980: (By Poll): Janaki Ballabh Patnaik (Congress-I)
1980: (47): Rasananda Sahu (Congress-I)
1977: (47): Rasamanjari Devi (JNP)
1974: (47): Radhanath Rath (Independent)
1971: (44): Radhanath Rath (Independent)
1967: (Bye Poll): Radhanath Rath (Independent)
1967: (44): Pabitra Mohan Pradhan (Orissa Jana Congress)
1961: (98): Achyutananda Das (Independent)
1957: (69): Radhanath Rath (Congress)
1951: (82): Radhanath Rath (Congress)

2019 Election Result

2014 Election Candidates
In 2014 election, Biju Janata Dal candidate Ranendra Pratap Swain defeated Indian National Congress candidate Bichitrananda Muduli by a margin of 68,420 votes.

2012 Election Results
In 2012 election, Biju Janata Dal candidate Ranendra Pratap Swain defeated Indian National Congress candidate Suresh Mohapatra by a margin of 47,390 votes.

2009 Election Results
In 2009 election, Independent candidate Ramesh Rout defeated Independent candidate Bichitrananda Muduli by a margin of 30,351 votes.

Notes

References

Assembly constituencies of Odisha
Politics of Cuttack district